Richard Klotzman is a concert promoter.

Career
Klotzman dominated the world of live personal appearances for several decades, promoting and producing concerts for the greatest artists in entertainment history. His client list includes T.I., Elvis Presley, Paul Anka, The Beatles, The Rolling Stones, Frank Sinatra, The Eagles, Neil Diamond, Tom Jones, Liza Minnelli, The Jacksons, Madonna, Luther Vandross, Teddy Pendergrass, Alice Cooper, Earth, Wind & Fire, Diana Ross, Seals and Crofts, Stevie Wonder, Cream, Prince, The Who, Led Zeppelin, Dr. Dre, Snoop Dogg, Queen Latifah, Public Enemy and so many more. His client list is far too long to include in this summary. No one person has had a greater impact on the development of contemporary music concert promotion and exclusive entertainment event planning for facilities throughout North America as Klotzman. It was in the late fifties, at the age of 13 ½ that Klotzman began his journey into the business of Entertainment. Beginning as a DJ for Radio, record hops and even Bar Mitzvahs, Klotzman knew early on that this was going to be his chosen career. His determination, tenacity, and creativity soon catapulted him to the top of his field.

Klotzman was always an innovator and forged a new era in concert touring, "the National Mega concert tour". He utilized arenas formerly exclusively used for Sports events as concert halls for the greatest Musical performers. He developed a network of exclusive venue representation and coordinated the country for the Artists. He sent the Artist across the country in customized buses leading convoys of truckloads of show gear traveling from city to city. Klotzman has produced over 25,000 live entertainment events over a period of 50 years. Now Klotzman heads the multimedia production and promotion consulting firm, Dick Klotzman Presents. He is currently working as a consultant in the Entertainment Industry for various firms throughout the country.

Litigation
In 1987 Klotzman was convicted of tax evasion, and sentenced to 3.5 years in prison. This conviction was for an action begun by the IRS in 1975. Assistant U.S. Attorney Herbert Better said Klotzman bilked two promoters in Anchorage, Alaska, of a $200,000 deposit in March 1985 during rock star Prince's Purple Rain Tour. Using an assumed name, Klotzman promised to set up a Prince concert in Anchorage, but instead pocketed the money.

He also kept a $120,000 deposit from an Austin, Texas, promoter and $100,000 each from promoters in Indianapolis and Denver in 1981 and 1982 to arrange concerts by Ross, Better said. Those concerts were never held.

The company that staged Prince's shows sued Klotzman in April 1985 for $10.5 million, charging he defrauded several promoters by promising to deliver Prince for concerts and collecting deposits to guarantee appearances. 
At that time it was discovered that Klotzman was bipolar and had been unmedicated for 45 years. Much of his self-destructive behavior during those years are directly attributable to the disease. In 1996 Klotzman was wrongfully arrested in connection with theft by deception charges. However, all charges were quickly dismissed and found to be without merit. He has been successfully medicated for the past 20 years.

References

External links 
Official website (archive)

Year of birth missing (living people)
Living people
American music industry executives
Music promoters